Cliff Island is an island in Casco Bay Maine. It is part of the city of Portland, Maine.  As of the 2000 census, the island had a  year-round population of approximately 60 people. In the summer, the island's population grows to about 200, despite the fact that it is the only year-round inhabited island in Casco Bay with no paved roads.  The ZIP Code for Cliff Island is 04019.

In the early 20th century the island's inns were a draw for summer tourists. There are no hotels any longer, but many homes are available for weekly rentals or longer. While there are no public services, residents enjoy a community hall, a tennis court, baseball field, and playground. The residents are served by a USPS Post Office, fire department, and one-room school for elementary grades. While the postal service has considered closing the office in the past, the islanders have managed to keep it in operation for six hours a day.

Transportation
Cliff Island residents (also known as Cliff Islanders) travel back and forth to the mainland via the Casco Bay Lines ferry service. The ride takes about one hour.  Cliff Islanders mostly buy groceries in Portland, but there is a small store on the island. In the summer, tourists taking the ferry as a cruise often step off to enjoy an ice-cream or pizza at the café.

Bicycles, golf carts and electric carts are most often used for transportation. A barge ramp was added in 2008 to ease delivery of trucks and heavy items.

In popular culture
In 1987 the feature film The Whales of August was filmed entirely on location on Cliff Island.  The buoy that was used in the film as a transitioning tool is now on display outside of the Casco Bay Lines Ferry Terminal.  The film was among the last for stars Bette Davis, Lillian Gish, Vincent Price, and Ann Sothern.

See also
 List of islands of Maine
 Edward S. Ellis

References

External links
 Official site

Islands of Portland, Maine
Islands of Casco Bay